Wang Bin (Chinese: 王宾; Pinyin: Wáng Bīn; born 23 May 1989) is a Chinese football player who currently is a free agent.

Club career
Wang Bin received professional football training in Brazilian club América, Mogi Mirim and XV de Piracicaba between 2002 and 2008. He moved to Chinese Super League side Changsha Ginde in 2009. He made his senior debut on 14 July 2010, in a 2–0 away defeat against Henan Construction. He played twice in the 2010 league season, as Changsha Ginde finished the bottom of the league and relegation to China League One. In February 2011, the club moved to Shenzhen as the club's name changed into Shenzhen Phoenix. The club were bought by Chinese property developers Guangzhou R&F and moved to Guangzhou in June 2011 and won promotion back to the Super League at the first attempt. Wang made 11 league appearances in the season. He was released at the end of the 2013 season. Wang joined China League Two side Shenyang Urban in 2016.

Wang moved aboard to Belgian First Division B side Roeselare along with Xu Jiajun in July 2017. On 1 December 2017, he made his debut for the club in a 1–0 away defeat against Beerschot Wilrijk, coming on as a substitute for Carlo Damman in the 68th minute.

Wang returned to China in March 2018 and joined China League Two side Shenyang Dongjin. On 23 June 2018, he made his debut in a 2–0 away defeat against Baotou Nanjiao. Wang became a free player in July 2018 when Shenyang Dongjin failed to register for the rest of the season due to wage arrears.

On 28 February 2019, Wang signed a contract with newly-relegated China League One side Guizhou Hengfeng.

Career statistics 
Statistics accurate as of match played 31 December 2020

References

External links
 

1989 births
Living people
Chinese footballers
Chinese expatriate footballers
Association football defenders
Footballers from Beijing
Changsha Ginde players
Guangzhou City F.C. players
K.S.V. Roeselare players
Liaoning Shenyang Urban F.C. players
Shenyang Dongjin players
Guizhou F.C. players
Challenger Pro League players
Chinese Super League players
China League One players
China League Two players
Expatriate footballers in Belgium